The Eliza Adams Lifeboat Memorial is a grade II listed memorial in Wells-next-the-Sea in Norfolk. It commemorates the death of 11 members of an RNLI lifeboat crew, who died in 1880 when a wave capsized their boat.

References

Public art in England
Royal National Lifeboat Institution
Monuments and memorials in Norfolk
Grade II listed monuments and memorials
Grade II listed buildings in Norfolk